Senator French may refer to:

Edward L. French (1860–1947), Washington State Senate
Ezra B. French (1810–1880), Maine State Senate
Harold F. French (fl. 2010s), New Hampshire State Senate
Hollis French (born 1958), Alaska State Senate
James M. French (1834–1916), Virginia State Senate
Levi B. French (1845–1923), South Dakota State Senate
Steve French (politician) (born 1962), Alabama State Senate